"A View to a Kill" is the thirteenth single by the English new wave and synth-pop band Duran Duran, released on 6 May 1985. Written and recorded as the theme for the James Bond film of the same name, it became one of the band's biggest hits. It remains the only James Bond theme song to have reached number one on the US Billboard Hot 100; it also made it to number two for three weeks on the UK Singles Chart while stuck behind Paul Hardcastle's "19". The song was the last track recorded by the most famous five-member lineup of Duran Duran until their reunion in 2001 and was also performed by the band at Live Aid in Philadelphia, their final performance together before their first split.

The following year, composer John Barry and Duran Duran were nominated for the Golden Globe Award for Best Original Song for "A View to a Kill". Following Barry's death in 2011, the band paid tribute to him for their encore at the Coachella Festival later that year, with Simon Le Bon reappearing in a tuxedo for a pared-down version backed by an orchestra, before launching into the familiar full-band hit version. Bassist John Taylor introduced the song by saying, "We lost a dear friend of ours this year. A great English composer familiar to Hollywood, his name was John Barry. We're gonna play this for him."

Background
The song was written by Duran Duran and John Barry, and recorded at Maison Rouge Studio and CTS Studio in London with a 60-piece orchestra.

Duran Duran were chosen to do the song after bassist John Taylor (a lifelong Bond fan) approached producer Cubby Broccoli at a party and somewhat drunkenly asked, "If I give you a fiver, can I write a theme tune please." The band was then introduced to Bond composer John Barry, and also composer/producer Jonathan Elias (with whom Duran Duran members would later work many times). An early writing meeting at Taylor's flat in Knightsbridge led to everyone getting drunk instead of composing.

Composition
Singer Simon Le Bon said of Barry: "He didn't really come up with any of the basic musical ideas. He heard what we came up with and he put them into an order. And that's why it happened so quickly because he was able to separate the good ideas from the bad ones, and he arranged them. He has a great way of working brilliant chord arrangements. He was working with us as virtually a sixth member of the group, but not really getting on our backs at all."

Due to a clear separation of areas of responsibility, the cooperation between band and composer turned out to be largely harmonious. The band was in charge of the actual songwriting while Barry created the final arrangement, including the orchestral parts. The song was finally completed in April 1985 and released that May. In the UK, it entered the singles chart at No. 7 before peaking at No. 2 the following week, and remained at that position for three weeks. In the US, it entered the charts at No. 45, and on 13 July it reached number one on the Billboard Hot 100 chart. It remains the only Bond theme to achieve this chart placing.

Reception
Cash Box described the single as "a memorable and dynamic cut and easily one of Duran Duran’s very best efforts" that is "melodically strong" and employs "highly sophisticated state of the art production."

Music video
The song's music video was filmed in the Eiffel Tower and was directed by the duo of Godley & Creme. The video opens with the iconic gun barrel sequence and is centered around the scene from the film where Max Zorin's henchwoman May Day kills private detective Achille Aubergine in front of James Bond at the Tower. It then cuts to the band walking by the Tower on a secret mission: Simon Le Bon, disguised as a tourist, wearing a gray trenchcoat and carrying a Walkman; John Taylor, a long-haired tourist dressed in black; Nick Rhodes, a photographer working with a top model; Andy Taylor, a blind accordionist who plays the Bond theme on the accordion; and Roger Taylor, a supervisor inside a van. The band's actions coincide with events shown from the movie, while Bond pursues May Day through the Tower, culminating in her escape via parachute. The video ends with a beautiful young girl approaching Le Bon to question him, "Excuse me... aren't you?", where he breaks the fourth wall to say, "Bon. Simon Le Bon". However, her moving Le Bon's arm to talk to him causes him to accidentally activate a detonator concealed inside his Walkman, blowing up the Eiffel Tower.

Track listing

UK 7-inch (EMI, Duran 007)
A: "A View to a Kill" – 3:37
B: "A View to a Kill (That Fatal Kiss)" – 2:31

 Also released in a gatefold sleeve (DURANG 007). Released by Capitol in US as B-5475. Reissued on CD in Singles Box Set 1981–1985 (2003).

Track List 12" US Promo 

Capitol Records – SPRO-9391
Format:	
Vinyl, 12", 33 ⅓ RPM, Promo
A		A View To A Kill	3:35
B		A View To A Kill	3:35

Unreleased Remix Version By Steve Thompson & Michael Barbiero 7:25 Minutes

previously unreleased remix of Duran Duran‘s A View To A Kill that has recently surfaced and since then there has been much debate over both the authenticity of the remix and who was responsible for the work involved. We are delighted to inform all you 1980’s pop fans out there that legendary producer and remixer Steve Thompson has been in touch with SDE and ‘filled in the blanks’,  putting the speculation to bed once and for all.

Steve had the following to say: “The mystery [is] solved. I did this mix with Mike Barbiero and the band was there except John. We did that mix in a studio in Paris. All [the] sounds of the mix were done with the band.“Echoing the views of Duran Duran fans who have always wondered why a twelve-inch version of the Bond theme was never released, Thompson added “I could never understand why the mix didn’t come out. And yes I brought it to [alternative New York radio station] WLIR because we were all friends of the station and I would always give them exclusives.”

In popular culture
DJ's Factory, a Eurodance project of German producer Bülent Aris and British keyboarder Adrian Askew, released a dancefloor-oriented version of the song in summer 1985, reaching No. 22 on the German single charts.

In 1987, Shirley Bassey covered the song for her album The Bond Collection, which contained her renditions of Bond theme songs. However, she wasn't satisfied with the quality, so the album was withdrawn from sale.

In 2008, the song was covered in a bossa nova style by former Morcheeba singer Skye on the various artists compilation album Hollywood, Mon Amour, containing cover versions of songs from 1980s films.

Måns Zelmerlöw performed a live version of the song at the beginning of the Andra Chansen (Second Chance) round of Melodifestivalen 2010 in Örebro, Sweden.

Further cover versions of the song have been recorded by the Welsh alternative metal band Lostprophets, Canadian punk rock band Gob, Australian band Custard, on the tribute album The Songs of Duran Duran: UnDone (1999), and the Chilean heavy metal band Los Mox, on their album ...Con Cover (2006). Finnish melodic death metal band Diablo has covered the song, as well as Finnish symphonic metal cover supergroup Northern Kings. Jay Gonzalez of Drive-By Truckers covered the song in a bossa nova style on the various artists compilation album Songs, Bond Songs: The Music of 007 (2017).

In 2016, Duran Duran performed the song live at the unveiling of the 2016 Mazda MX-5 (ND).

Personnel
Duran Duran
 Simon Le Bon – vocals
 Andy Taylor – guitars
 John Taylor – bass
 Roger Taylor – drums
 Nick Rhodes – keyboards

Technical
 Bernard Edwards – co-producer
 Jason Corsaro –  co-producer, engineer, mixing
 Duran Duran – co-producer
 John Barry – orchestral arranger, conductor
 John Elias – digital sampling

Charts and certifications

Weekly charts

Year-end charts

Certifications and sales

As of October 2021 "A View to a Kill" is the seventh most streamed Duran Duran song in the UK.

Other appearances
Albums:
 Decade (1989)
 Greatest (1998)
 Singles Box Set 1981–1985 (2003)
 Encore Series 78–03 Reunion Tour (2003)
 Live from London (2005)

See also
 James Bond music
 Outline of James Bond

References

Duran Duran songs
1985 singles
Billboard Hot 100 number-one singles
Cashbox number-one singles
RPM Top Singles number-one singles
Number-one singles in Belgium
Number-one singles in Italy
Number-one singles in Spain
Number-one singles in Sweden
Songs from James Bond films
Song recordings produced by Bernard Edwards
Song
Music videos directed by Godley and Creme
Songs with music by John Barry (composer)
1985 songs
EMI Records singles
Capitol Records singles